Osian or Osiyan may refer to:

 Ancient nomadic tribes:
 Asii, also known as the Osians in Central Asia
 Osi (tribe) in Eastern Europe
 OSIAN, an Open Source IPv6 Automation Network for wireless sensors
 Osian art fund, an arts fund started in Mumbai (2010)
 Osian, Jodhpur, a city in Rajasthan, India
 Osian (name), a name common in Wales, derived from the Irish Oisín
 Osiyan, Unnao, a village in Unnao district, Uttar Pradesh, India

See also 
 Ossian (disambiguation)